Macroglossum kishidai is a moth of the  family Sphingidae. It is found in Sulawesi.

References

Macroglossum
Moths described in 1998